Claridon Congregational Church is a historic church building on U.S. Route 322 in Claridon Township in Geauga County, Ohio.

The Greek Revival meetinghouse was constructed in 1831 and added to the National Register of Historic Places in 1974. The congregation is currently affiliated with the United Church of Christ (UCC).

References

External links

Official website

United Church of Christ churches in Ohio
Churches on the National Register of Historic Places in Ohio
Greek Revival church buildings in Ohio
Churches completed in 1831
Buildings and structures in Geauga County, Ohio
National Register of Historic Places in Geauga County, Ohio